"Pastor" Rahajason (1897-1971) was a writer and a Christian priest from Madagascar.

He wrote the lyrics of the national anthem of Madagascar Ry Tanindraza nay malala ô (Oh, Beloved Homeland of Our Ancestors) in 1958. Norbert Raharisoa composed the music of this anthem.

References 

1897 births
1971 deaths
Malagasy male writers
National anthem writers
20th-century Malagasy poets
Malagasy male poets
20th-century male writers
Malagasy-language writers